Campbellville (Bellshill Airpark) Aerodrome  is  southwest of Campbellville, Ontario, Canada.

References

Registered aerodromes in Ontario